Grauzone (German for "grey area") was a band from Berne, Switzerland, that was active and disbanded in the early 1980s. The band is most famous for their 1981 hit "Eisbär" ("Polar Bear"). The single charted at number 12 in Germany and number 6 in Austria. In addition to "Eisbär", they had some success with the singles "Film 2" and "Wütendes Glas".

History

Foundation 
At the end of 1979, Marco Repetto (drums) and GT (bass) left the punk band Glueams to form a new band called Grauzone with Martin Eicher (guitar, vocals, synthesizer). Martin had already supported Glueams on their single '"Mental". They gave their first concert in March 1980 at club Spex in Berne. Martin's brother Stephan Eicher (guitar, synthesizer), Max Kleiner and Claudine Chirac (saxophone) supplemented the group temporarily in live appearances and recordings.

After ten concerts, four singles and an album the group split up at the end of 1982.

After Grauzone 
GT and Marco Repetto formed a new band Missing Link, later Eigernordwand, with the former Glueams guitarist Martin Pavlinec and the drummer Dominique Uldry. GT supplemented the futurism oriented  performance group "Red Catholic Orthodox Jewish Chorus" around performance artist Edy Marconi, in which occasionally Marco Repetto also played. Later the group changed their name to I Suonatori.

Stephan Eicher started a successful solo career.

In 1988, Martin Eicher published his solo-EP Spellbound Lovers. In 1989, Marco Repetto started a new career as a Techno and Ambient DJ, musician and producer (a.o. mittageisen v2).

Discography

Studio albums 
1981 – Grauzone (D No. 37)

Compilation albums 
1998 – Die Sunrise Tapes
2010 – Grauzone 1980–1982 (double album – remastered)

Singles 
1981 – "Eisbär/Ich lieb sie" (D No. 12, A No. 6)
1981 – "Moskau/Ein Tanz mit dem Tod/Ich lieb sie"
1982 – "Träume mit mir/Wütendes Glas"
1983 – "Moskau/Film 2"

External links 
Official band-website at the indie-label mital-U

Swiss new wave musical groups
Neue Deutsche Welle groups
Swiss post-punk music groups